Archips fervidana, the oak webworm moth, is a moth of the family Tortricidae. It is found from Maine and Quebec to North Carolina, west to Wisconsin and Arkansas.

The wingspan is 18–25 mm. The forewings are orange and grey, with a median band of orange that includes two dark brown blotches.  Beyond this median band, there is a band of dark grey followed by several grey lines near the apex. The fringe is dirty beige.

The larvae feed on Carya and Quercus species.

References

Moths described in 1860
Archips
Moths of North America